Wisanu Subsompon (Thai: วิศณุ ทรัพย์สมพล) is a Thai academic and politician, currently serving as a Deputy Governor of Bangkok. Prior to his appointment, Subsompon was Vice President for Property and Physical Management a Chulalongkorn University and an associate professor of civil engineering.

Early life and education 
Subsompon received a bachelors of engineering from Chulalongkorn University, and an MS and Ph.D in civil engineering from Carnegie Mellon University.

Career 
Subsompon is charged with Bangkok Metropolitan Administration (BMA) infrastructure, water drainage and traffic. He has helped to coordinate emergency preparation and response to flooding in Bangkok, including from Typhoon Noru.

References 

Living people
Wisanu Subsompon
Carnegie Mellon University alumni
Wisanu Subsompon
Year of birth missing (living people)